The Schmittenhöhe is a mountain,  high, on the eastern edge of the Kitzbühel Alps. It is the local mountain of the district capital of Zell am See, from where a cable car was built in 1927 by Adolf Bleichert & Co. that runs to the summit. The cable car system has been renovated several times since. From the summit of the Schmittenhöhe there is a good view of over 30 three-thousanders as well as the lake of Zeller See, the river basin and the whole Saalach valley.

Climate 

The Schmittenhöhe has pistes for winter sports. From the Schmittenhöhe numerous long-distance flights may be made by paraglider into the Pinzgau region whose straight, east-west orientation enables long flights to be made.

References

External links 

Mountains of the Alps
Mountains of Salzburg (state)
One-thousanders of Austria
Kitzbühel Alps
Ski areas and resorts in Austria
Zell am See
Tourist attractions in Salzburg (state)